George Philip Waring (born 2 December 1994) is an English footballer who plays as a forward for Curzon Ashton.

Career

Stoke City
Waring was born in Chester and began his career at his local club Chester City before joining Everton at the age of 14. At the age of 16 he scored the winning goal for Everton U18s in the final of the U18s Premier League Cup. He signed for Stoke City in April 2013. Waring began the 2013–14 season with the U21s and scored four goals against West Bromwich Albion on 5 September 2013. However, he missed the rest of the campaign due to injury, returning in June 2014 to play in the Altstatten International Tournament.

On 8 January 2015, Waring joined League One side Barnsley on a one-month loan. He made his professional debut on 10 January 2015 against Yeovil Town, scoring his first professional goal in a 2–0 victory. On 2 February 2015, after an impressive initial loan spell, Waring's loan at Barnsley was extended until the end of the 2014–15 season. Waring had a successful spell with the Tykes, scoring six times in 19 appearances as the team finished in 11th position.

Waring joined League Two side Oxford United on a month's loan in February 2016. Waring remained with Oxford for the remainder of their promotion winning 2015–16 season making a total of 15 appearances scoring once.

On 15 August 2016 Waring joined Shrewsbury Town on a six-month loan along with Stoke teammate Moha El Ouriachi. Waring made 18 appearances for the Shrews but failed to hit the back of the net.

On 31 January 2017 Waring joined Carlisle United on loan until the end of the 2016–17 season. Waring played ten times for Carlisle helping the club reach the play-offs where they lost to Exeter City. He was released by Stoke at the end of the 2016–17 season.

Tranmere Rovers
Following his release by Stoke, Waring signed a two-year contract with National League side Tranmere Rovers.

In October 2017, he joined FC Halifax Town on loan, a spell that was then extended until January 2018.

In January 2018, he joined Kidderminster Harriers on loan.

On 7 July 2018, he scored a goal for Grimsby Town in a friendly against Cleethorpes Town whilst on trial. Grimsby manager Michael Jolley announced a couple of days later that Grimsby would not be pursuing an interest in Waring.

In November 2018, he rejoined Kidderminster Harriers on loan.

Chester
In January 2019, he joined Chester.

Curzon Ashton
In the summer of 2022, he transferred to fellow National League North divisional rivals Curzon Ashton.

Career statistics

References

External links

1994 births
Living people
English footballers
Everton F.C. players
Stoke City F.C. players
Barnsley F.C. players
Oxford United F.C. players
Shrewsbury Town F.C. players
Carlisle United F.C. players
Tranmere Rovers F.C. players
Chester F.C. players
Kidderminster Harriers F.C. players
FC Halifax Town players
Curzon Ashton F.C. players
English Football League players
National League (English football) players
Association football forwards